Yakadaya is a 1977 Sri Lankan Sinhala action thriller film directed by Neil Rupasinghe and produced by Simon Marawanagoda. It stars Gamini Fonseka and Ravindra Randeniya in lead roles along with Anula Karunathilaka and Jenita Samaraweera. Music composed by Sarath Dassanayake. It is the 381st Sri Lankan film in the Sinhala cinema.

The film is loosely based on the life of popular criminal Sanchi Arachchige Jinadasa aka 'Maradankadawala Yakadaya'.

Plot

Cast
 Gamini Fonseka as Sumanadasa 'Sumane' 'Yakadaya'
 Ravindra Randeniya as Siripala
 Jenita Samaraweera as Somey
 Anula Karunathilaka as Rathi
 Anthony C. Perera as Bandara
 Rex Kodippili as Police Chief
 Alexander Fernando as Chaubey
 Shanthi Lekha as Somey's mother
 Denawaka Hamine as Granny
 Wilson Karunaratne as Truck fighter
 Bandu Samarasinghe as Dancer 
 Somy Rathnayake as Hit storekeeper

Songs
The film consists with four songs.

References

1977 films
1970s Sinhala-language films
Films set in Sri Lanka (1948–present)